"Love Is Gonna Get You" (also known as "Love Is Gonna Get Ya") is a song by American singer and songwriter Macy Gray, released as the only single from her greatest hits album, The Very Best of Macy Gray (2004).

"Love Is Gonna Get You" was only released as a promotional single in the United Kingdom. Nevertheless, the song was given a full commercial release in Austria and the Netherlands with a live version of "I Try" as its B-side. The song was Gray's final release for Epic Records, and no music video was produced to back the single release. The song's official UK release date was originally set for August 16, 2004, however, the release was Gray's second consecutive single release to be canceled there.

The song was used as the opening theme song for the 2003 NBC series Miss Match.

Track listing
CD single
"Love Is Gonna Get You" – 3:00
"I Try" (The Jo Whiley Radio 1 Session) – 4:15

Charts

References

2004 singles
2004 songs
Epic Records singles
Macy Gray songs
Song recordings produced by Mike Elizondo
Songs written by Macy Gray
Songs written by Mike Elizondo
Comedy television theme songs
Television drama theme songs
Disco songs